Discovery Kids (stylised as Discovery K!ds) was an Australian subscription television channel, aimed at 2-6 year olds screening factual and educational programming. The channel launched on Foxtel on 3 November 2014.

The channel replaced Discovery Home & Health, whose select programming moved to TLC.

The channel ceased operations on 1 February 2020, after which the channel space created in 2007 by Discovery Home & Health ceased to exist. No reason was given to why it ceased.

Programming 
 Discovery Kids España
 Ace: Animal Countdown Extraordinaire 
 Adventure 8 Zoo Games
 All About Animals
 America's Cutest
 Animal Atlas
 Peppa Pig
 Art Ninja
 Be the Creature
 Cats 101
 Crafty Kids Club
 Creature Mania
 Danger! Wild Animals
 Deadly 60
 Deadly Art
 Deadly Nightmares of Natures
 Dino Dan
 Dogs 101
 Doki
 Earth to Luna!
 Endurance
 Feeding Time
 Fetch! with Ruff Ruffman
 Finding Stuff Out
 Fishtronaut
 Gastronauts
 Head Rush
 Hero Squad
 Horrible Histories
 Insectibles
 Jungle Book Safari
 Junior Bake Off
 Junior Vets
 Kids vs Film
 Kika & Bob
 Make it Big, Make it Small
 Making Stuff
 Meet the Menagerie
 Must Love Cats
 Officially Amazing
 On the Spot
 One Minute Wonders
 Operation Ouch!
 Papyrus
 Pet School
 Pok & Mok
 Quirky Science
 Secret Millionaires Club
 Tales of Tatonka
 The Adrenaline Project
 The Fixies
 The Green Squad
 Think Big
 Thomas Edison's Secret Lab
 Totally Wild
 Underdog to Wonderdog
 We're Talking Animals
 Wild But True
 Wild Kratts
 You're Called What!
 Zoo Clues

References

2014 establishments in Australia
2020 disestablishments in Australia
Defunct television channels in Australia
Children's television channels in Australia
English-language television stations in Australia
Television channels and stations established in 2014
Television channels and stations disestablished in 2020
Australia
Discovery Kids Australia